Nautilus Deep Space Observatory (NDSO) (also known as Nautilus array, Nautilus mission, Nautilus program, Nautilus telescope array and Project Nautilus) is a proposed deep space fleet of space telescopes designed to search for biosignatures of life in the atmospheres of exoplanets.

Daniel Apai, lead astronomer of NDSO from the University of Arizona, and associated with the Steward Observatory and the Lunar and Planetary Laboratory, commented "[With this new space telescope technology], we will be able to vastly increase the light-collecting power of telescopes, and among other science, study the atmospheres of 1,000 potentially Earth-like planets for signs of life."

Overview 
The NDSO mission is based on the development of very lightweight telescope mirrors that enhance the power of space telescopes, while substantially lowering manufacturing and launch costs.  The concept is based not on traditional reflective optics but on diffractive optics, employing a single diffractive lens  made of a multiorder diffractive engineered (MODE) material. A MODE lens is ten times lighter and 100 times less susceptible to misalignments than conventional lightweight large telescope mirrors.

The NDSO telescope array of 35 spacecraft, when used all together, would have the resolving power equivalent to a  diameter telescope. With such telescopic power, the NDSO would be able to analyze the atmospheres of 1,000 exoplanets up to 1,000 light years away.

In January 2019, the NDSO research team, which includes lead astronomer Daniel Apai, as well as Tom Milster, Dae Wook Kim and Ronguang Liang from the University of Arizona College of Optical Sciences, and Jonathan Arenberg from Northrop Grumman Aerospace Systems, received a $1.1 million support grant from the Moore Foundation in order to construct a prototype of a single telescope, and test it on the  Kuiper Telescope before December 2020.

Spacecraft

Each individual Nautilus unit has a single solid MODE lens and would be packed in stackable form for a shared rocket launch, and once deployed, each unit would inflate into a  diameter Mylar balloon with the instrument payload in the center.

See also 
 Astrobiology
 Biosignature
 Carl Sagan Institute
 SISTINE - another way to search for life on exoplanets

References

External links 
 
 Deep Space Workshop (2018)

Northrop Grumman spacecraft
Space telescopes
Proposed satellites